Parisville is a parish municipality in the Centre-du-Québec region of the province of Quebec in Canada.

Despite being a parish municipality rather than an ordinary municipality, its website refers to it as simply "Municipalité de Parisville" rather than "municipalité de paroisse de Parisville".

Demographics 

See also
List of parish municipalities in Quebec

References

External links

Parish municipalities in Quebec
Incorporated places in Centre-du-Québec